McPhersonville is an unincorporated community in eastern Hampton County, South Carolina, United States, near the county's borders with Beaufort and Jasper counties. Once an important center of affluence and culture in colonial Prince William Parish (roughly analogous to modern-day Hampton County), McPhersonville is now little more than a marked location on a secondary road between Yemassee and Early Branch.

Geography 
McPhersonville is located at 32° 41' 31" North, 80° 55' 09" West (32.6918437, -80.9192743). It is approximately 85 feet above sea level. The McPhersonville area is largely shady pine forests in sandy soil, which made it an attractive summer retreat for colonial plantation owners from the lower areas closer to the Atlantic coast, along with their extended families.

Early history 
By the time of European colonization, Yemassee and Creek Indians had established trading posts, trails, burial grounds and ceremonial grounds throughout the pine woods and swampland surrounding McPhersonville. The first lasting English settlements in the McPhersonville area date to the 1670s, before the Carolinas were divided in 1729. In 1682, the Proprietary County of Colleton was established, within which were later created Parishes of St. Bartholomew's (1706), Prince William (1745), St. Peter's (1747) and St. Luke's (1767). In 1769, Beaufort District was created from the merger of three earlier parishes: St. Peter's, St. Luke's, and Prince William, the latter roughly corresponding to modern-day Hampton County.

McPhersonville proper was established by rice planters from along the Combahee and nearby rivers, who valued the inland area's cool winds, relatively low humidity and dense pine shade canopy. General James McPherson and his family were among the earliest residents; they were followed by the Drayton, McLeod, Pope, Mackey, Verdier, Brailsford, Martin, Palmer, McDougal, DeSaussure, Screven, Colcock, Hutson and Gregorie families. The Yamasee War of 1715 was largely fought in the areas around McPhersonville. It involved the Yamasee, Creeks, and many other tribes who rebelled against the unfair business practices of the region's white traders. Hundreds of colonists were killed and the loss of property was dramatic.

Revolutionary War 
During the Revolutionary War, British troops occupied the plantation of Isaac McPherson (described as "a great Rebel, a man of property" in contemporary reports) in March, 1780, after unsuccessfully trying to chase down 50 American troops on horseback. During their stay the British engaged in what they thought was a skirmish with the enemy, but mistakenly attacked their own troops. The British left McPherson's Plantation and marched to the crossing of the Saltketcher (now the Salkehatchie) River, where a bridge had stood before the beginning of the war. They were met by 80 American militiamen who tried to prevent their crossing. The British Light Infantry crossed the river below this spot and came up behind the Americans. A captain and 16 privates were bayoneted to death by the British.

Civil War 
 During the Civil War, McPhersonville was overrun early in the Carolinas Campaign by Union Maj. Gen. William T. Sherman's forces. Only two pre-Civil War homes and one church escaped the Union Army's passage through the village. Stoney Creek Independent Presbyterian Chapel of Prince William Parish is the daughter chapel of old Stoney Creek Presbyterian Church, built in 1743 on the other side of the Pocotaligo River. The chapel was used as a hospital during the Civil War. It is on the National Register of Historic Places. Historic Prince William's Episcopal Church, on the other hand, did not survive the Civil War; it was first built in 1832, as a summer place of worship by the congregation of Sheldon Church of Prince William's Parish (now famous as "Old Sheldon" ruins). Sherman's army destroyed it in 1865 following its use by the Confederates as a smallpox clinic. Prince William's strongest timbers were used to build bridges across the Combahee, and the Federals set fire to the rest. It was rebuilt in its present modest form in 1898.

Modern history 
The economic tumult of the post-Civil War Reconstruction era, compounded by the destruction of the local infrastructure by Sherman's troops began a long era of decline for McPhersonville, in terms of its commerce, summer occupancy and year-round population. The McPhersonville post office closed in the 1950s and the community is now served by Yemassee's branch office. There are no significant businesses in modern McPhersonville, though the area has experienced a small renaissance in the past 20 years as modern property owners and investors are drawn to the same favorable environmental conditions that lured the early settlers. Stoney Creek Independent Presbyterian Chapel is now administered by Stoney Creek Presbyterian Foundation, associated with First Presbyterian Church in Beaufort.  It was used as the Four Square Baptist Church where Gump prays with the choir for shrimp in the film Forrest Gump.

References

Unincorporated communities in Hampton County, South Carolina
Unincorporated communities in South Carolina